The Kingdom of Bamoun (also spelled Bamoum, Bamun, Bamoun, or Mum) (1394–c. 1916) is a pre-colonial Central African state in what is now northwest Cameroon. It was founded by the Bamun, an ethnic group from northeast Cameroon. Its capital was the ancient walled city of Fumban.

Origins
The Mbam-et-Inoubou and the Grassfields, Bamum people(Bamoun) and bafia people share ancestry.
Origin: Old Bamum Kingdom (Cameroon)
Biography: Bamum Kingdom was a pre-colonial state located in the northwest of present-day
Cameroon. The Bamъm are an ethnic group of Tikar origin, who spread through the Grasslands
Territories and established a political entity in the 17th century, reaching its splendor around
their capital, Foumban, along the 19th century.
The Bamum were a hierarchical society, in which the king (fon) was the highest authority. The
use of certain materials, objects and symbols were monopoly of the monarch, who used them
as a power symbol. This privilege could be extended to other levels of the hierarchy, which
granted status to whoever possessed them, and showed the relationship between the king and
his subjects, and amidst the monarch, the nobility and other strata. According to this, the
Bamun kingsґ throne is considered an excellent example of political art at the service of power.
The Bamum throne consists of several solid pieces of assembled wood, lined with a mesh of
European glass beads and cowrie shells (mbьm) (used as currency, payment of dowries, etc.).
The seat of the throne is cylindrical and carved with two-headed serpents (an attribute of royal
power).

Few artistic works of Africa have garnered as much admiration and sheer awe as the beaded
thrones from the Cameroon Grasslands that found their way into European museums in the
early 1900s. These multi-colored, beaded thrones and stools—particularly those of King
Nsangou, sixteenth king of the Bamoun dynasty, and his son, King Njoya Ibrahim—incorporate
Anthropomorphic and zoomorphic designs integral to the Bamoun culture and are among the
crown jewels of ethnographic museums in Paris, Geneva, Berlin, and other world capitals. The
research of Claude Tardits, Christraud Geary, Silvia Forni, and other dedicated anthropologists
have, over the past seventy years, gleaned rare insights into the central role played by these
thrones and other works of art in the daily life and formal celebrations of the Bamoun kingdom.
These scholars have also helped clarify the dynamics of the African art markets, from the arrival
of Europeans in West and Central Africa to the present. Many studies have documented the
removal, whether through coercion or commercial exchange, of art from local chieftaincies and
regional kingdoms; but comparatively little research has explored how local populations
protected cultural patrimony from seizure and destruction or of their use of those same cultural
idioms to resist colonial depredations and cultural impositions. The research of Tardits and
others has also documented how recent pressure from external markets, largely European, has
stimulated growth of some local workshops that produce modern, visionary artworks, while
encouraging other craftsmen to create reproductions of much older pieces—even at the risk of
eroding the integrity of antique African art markets.

During King Njoya’s reign (c. 1886–1933), the art market was centralized; that is, it was
managed and overseen by the king himself. During the initial years of his reign, when Cameroon
was still under German control, Njoya was the sole authority on what styles of art objects
would be produced, which works would be gifted to the colonial regime, and what artisans
would be involved in this exchange. As the flow of missionaries, administrators, military
officers, traders, and adventurers to the Grasslands increased—and as the renown of Bamoun
artisans spread throughout Europe—a more relaxed and diversified commercial exchange
bloomed, including the importing and assimilation of objects and styles from other African
tribes.

In the wake of Germany’s defeat in World War I, Cameroon became a French colony, and the
tentative cooperation that had existed between King Njoya and the German authorities was
quickly undermined. That collaborative relationship was replaced by the wholesale dismantling
of local governance, imposition of French administrative control at all levels, and the
acceleration of resource extraction and other forms of economic exploitation, all of which led
to considerable friction between King Njoya and the French. The art market, certainly, did not
escape disruption. As tensions between the king and the French escalated, conflicts within the
Bamoun populace flared as well, as various Bamoun notables vied with each other to win the
confidence and favor of the French administrators. One such conflict, which emerged in the
early 1920s, involved Mosй Yйyap, a Bamoun noble and Christian convert, who began to
challenge the king’s authority over local artisans as well as his influence with the French in the
lucrative sphere of artistic commerce. Yйyap steadily expanded his commercial art enterprise
with French collectors and authorities, even opening his own museum to compete with the
Royal Museum in Foumban. Meanwhile, French displeasure with Njoya, whom they increasingly
regarded as a subversive, incorrigible autocrat, culminated in his exile from his Bamoun
kingdom in 1924.

When King Njoya died in exile in 1933, the French selected one of his many sons, Njimoluh
Seidou, to replace the beloved king, rather than allow the royal court to choose the legitimate
successor to the Bamoun kingdom. As links between France and its African colonies temporarily
Slackened during the latter part of World War II, Seidou sought to reaffirm control of local
Government to answer the needs of his people: to that end, he drew on the Nkom secret
society and other counselors to elevate Bamoun customs and cultural identity. It was during
this time of political and cultural flux that the Tikar chieftaincy of Rifum ordered the creation of
the Madou-Yenou thrones. The craftsman’s task was given to Njikam Isidore, grandson of the
great sculptor of King Njoya’s reign, Nji Gbetom Salifou. As was the custom, two thrones were
made at the same time; the second as a backup, in case anything should happen to the primary
throne. The two thrones were completed between 1945 and 1946. The striking similarities of
the two—e.g., the use of traditional Bamoun designs, the posture of the thrones’ figures, and
their facial features—confirm their esteemed place in the time-honored Bamoun tradition of
crafting dual thrones.

Following World War II, Cameroon became a United Nations Trust Territory and joined what
was then known as the French Union, with a loosely defined pathway to independence that was
sanctioned by the Allied powers. Seidou’s efforts to revitalize Bamoun culture extended to the
postwar period, when the French reignited tensions in the region with their push to speed the
postwar recovery of the French metropole by increasing taxes and resource extraction in
Cameroon. During this time, Seidou promoted handicrafts and diverse types of art; he further
Liberalized the local art market to stimulate production for a nascent export market.
Meanwhile, the Algerian War (1954-62), by now the focal point of France’s involvement in
Africa, further energized Cameroonian opposition to the French and the battle cry for
independence. Friction between French authorities and settlers, who challenged the emerging
local economic and political elites, exacerbated the situation, fueling the struggle for
independence and eventually sparking a catastrophic civil war that led to the deaths of tens of
thousands of Cameroonians. King Seidou, who was a major force behind both the formation of
his nation and the unification of eastern and western Cameroon, consistently promoted the
Primacy of Bamoun culture in preparing his people for the new challenges of nationhood.

Incidentally, there is a fascinating historical footnote regarding the local perspective on the
creation of King Seidou’s thrones. According to local lore, King Seidou declared that the new
throne, while modeled on the thrones of his predecessors, should also be an extension and
affirmation of centuries old Bamoun traditions. That historical tradition stems from the reign of
King Ngouloure, tenth king of the Bamoun dynasty, who ruled from 1629 to 1672. Ngouloure
had two wives, Yenou and Madou. Just prior to his death, Ngouloure summoned Madou, his
second, younger wife, and told her, “When I die, your son will be my successor.” Dismayed,
Madou responded, “No, I am still a young woman, and I can have more children. It would be
better to give the line of succession to Yenou, your first wife, whose son Koutou will be more
capable of leading the kingdom.”

During the 18th century, the kingdom faced the threat of invasion from the north by Fulani and Chamba warriors. By the end of the century, Bamum had perhaps 10,000-12,000 within its domain. The history and customs of the Bamum list 10 kings between the founder and Kuotu. The ten kings who followed Nchare are not remembered for anything special. They were not conquerors, and territorial expansion did not occur until the reign of the tenth Mbum, Mbum Mbuembue, in the early 19th century.[1]
King Mbuembue was the first ruler to expand the Bamun Kingdom. He was famous for repelling an attack by the Fulani in the early 19th century. Mfon Mbuembue took steps to fortify the capital with the construction of a trench.

Now the Fulani invaders and attackers extended their invasion to different part of the kingdom trying to conquer major villagers.
This is when these 9 warriors stood up and form an alliance and residences against the Fulani people and defeated them using black magic and other super natural powers, they then went into the interiors of the kingdom and form their own village and community.
So these statues where made in recognition of the 9 warriors who defended their village against any form of invasion from the Fulani’s.
So these statues have been kept for centuries and have been worshipped believe to have super natural mystic powers.
The Bamum kingdom was originally founded by the older brother of the Tikar royal dynasty. The founding king (called a "fon" or "mfon") was Nchare, a conqueror reputed to have crushed some 18 rulers. King Nchare founded the capital Foumban, then called Mfomben. This first group of Tikar emigrants conquerors absorbed the language and customs of their new subjects and were from then on known as Mbum. It is believed that Chamba migrations from the Tikar Plain in the southern part of the western Adamawa Plateau resulted in the kingdom's foundation.

Despite similarities between them, the Tikar and Bamum are two separate ethnic groups.

Organization
The Bamum kingdom's population used secret societies. One society, the ngiri, was for princes. Another, the mitngu, was for the general populace regardless of social status. The mfon recruited most of his retainers from twins and the sons of princesses.

The king of Bamum was known as the mfon, a title shared by Tikar rulers. The mfon engaged in large-scale polygamy giving rise to a proliferation of royal lineages. This led to the palace nobility growing rapidly.

Culture

Little is known about the kingdom's material and social culture during this time. Originally, the language of state in the Bamum kingdom was that of the Tikar. This apparently did not last long, and the language of the conquered Mben was adopted. The economy was largely agricultural, and slave owning was practiced on a small scale. The Bamum kingdom traded with neighboring populations. They imported salt, iron, beads, cotton goods and copper objects.

The Bamun developed an extensive artistic culture at their capital of Foumban at the beginning of the 20th century. During Njoya’s reign six color dye pits were maintained. The Mbum imported indigo-dyed raffia-sewn cloth from the Hausa as royal cloth. This royal cloth was called Ntieya, and Hausa craftsmen were kept at palace workshops to supply nobles and teach the art of dyeing.

History
During the 18th century, the kingdom faced the threat of invasion from the north by Fulani and Chamba warriors. By the end of the century, Bamum had perhaps 10,000-12,000 within its domain. The history and customs of the Bamum list ten kings between the founder and Kuotu. The nine kings who followed Nchare are not remembered for anything special. They were not conquerors, and territorial expansion did not occur until the reign of the tenth Mbum, Mbum Mbuembue, in the early 19th century.

King Mbuembue was the first ruler to expand the Bamun Kingdom. He was famous for repelling an attack by the Fulani in the early 19th century. Mfon Mbuembue took steps to fortify the capital with the construction of a trench. He was the founder of the emblem of the Bamun people, characteristic of their capabilities to fight in two fronts and win both at the same time. He represented the Bamun people by a snake with two heads known as "Ngnwe peh tu."

German invasion
The Bamun kingdom voluntarily became part of German Kamerun in 1884 during the reign of Mfon Nsangou. During his reign, Bamum fought a war with the Nso. By the end of the conflict, the king was killed, and his head was carried off by the Nso. Immediately after, one of the king's wives, Njapdunke, took over the kingdom's government with her lover Gbetnkom Ndo`mbue. (Gbetnkom was not the mfon as there was another Gbetnkom who was the son of Mfon Mbuembue the great conqueror.) After the death of Mfon Mbuembue, there was no male heir to inherit his throne. Njapdunke took over for some time but failed to represent the king. She was removed and it was thought that one of the king's sons Mbetnkom was at a village called Massagham for treatment. He was brought back and became Mfon Mbetnkom.

Mbetnkom was a short man, a dictator who had the legs of those who were taller than him chopped off. This was a practice that cost his life during a hunting training session. After his death, his little son, Mbienkuo succeeded him. He was too young to rule. It became a habit for him to want to know who was his father amongst the people who were taking guards behind him. His court led by Ngouoh became doubtful and thought the boy may eventually learn that they are the people who killed his father. Mfon Mbienkuo was carried away and killed in a place called "Mfe shut Mfon mbwere." The throne remained vacant for some time and Ngouoh, the leader of the court ultimately became Mfon. He unfortunately was not a descendant of king Mbuembue. He was a Bamileke slave. Ngouoh was not welcome by his subjects and decided to move the palace to his own location. Mfon Ngouoh was later chased away after a fierce fight between him and the followers of Mbuembue. Nsangou, a grandson of Mbuembue became king.

Njoya the Great

Eventually King Njoya, son of the slain king, came to power. He was one of Bamum's most prolific rulers and ruled from approximately 1883 to 1931. He voluntarily put his kingdom under the protection of German colonial power and was responsible for modernizing certain elements of Mbum society.

In 1897, Njoya and his court converted to Islam, a decision that would affect Bamun culture long after Njoyua's death. He invented the Bamum script so that his people could record Bamum's history. In 1910, Njoya had a school constructed where the script was taught. Germans were allowed to set up the Basel Mission at the capital of and construction was undertaken to build a temple. A school was built, staffed by missionaries who taught in German and the native language. The Germans introduced new housing construction techniques while settling among the kingdom's inhabitants as farmers, traders and educators. King Njoya remained loyal to his German overlords who respected his rights as king and consulted him on colonial business.

Another important element in the kingdom's history during German protection was the introduction of sweet potatoes, macabo and other new foods, which helped the kingdom become more prosperous. The Mbum were able to trade outside their traditional borders, and the income greatly improved the standard of living. King Njoya was much influenced by the missionaries who denounced idols, human sacrifice and polygamy. In response, Njoya cut back on royal excesses. Nobles were allowed to marry slaves and those of the non-landed servile class. The king, however, remained unconverted to Christianity. He merged some of the tenets of Christianity and Islam with traditional beliefs to create a new religion more palatable to his subjects.

In 1906, Germany sent an expeditionary force against the Nso backed up by King Njoya's warriors. After the victory, the force reclaimed the head of Njoya's father, which was crucial for legitimizing the king. From then on, the bond between Bamum and Germany was strong.

World War I and French invasion
In 1914, the Allies invaded German Kamerun as part of the West African campaign. Fumban was captured by the British under Colonel Gorges in December 1915, and Gorges included a first-hand account of the people and their capital in his book. Gorges described Njoya as being understandably "a trifle nervous" when they first met but accepted British rule once he was reassured that no harm would come to him or his people. In 1918, Germany's colonial possessions including Kamerun were divided between Great Britain and France, and the kingdom of Bamoun thus fell under French rule. In 1923 Njoya was deposed, and his script was banned by the French.

See also
 List of rulers of the Bamum
 History of Cameroon
 Bamum (people)

References

Sources and further reading

Gorges E.H. (1930). The Great War in West Africa. Hutchinson & Co. Ltd., London; Naval & Military Press, Uckfield, 2004: 

History of Cameroon
States and territories established in 1394
States and territories disestablished in 1884
Former monarchies of Africa
Countries in precolonial Africa